Sin Piedad (2007) (Spanish for "No Mercy") was a professional wrestling pay-per-view (PPV) produced by Consejo Mundial de Lucha Libre (CMLL), which took place on December 7, 2007 in Arena México, Mexico City, Mexico. The 2007 Sin Piedad was the sixth event under that name that CMLL promoted as their last major show of the year, always held in December. The main event of Sin Piedad was originally supposed to be a tag team Lucha de Apuesta, hair vs. hair match between the teams of Shocker and Rey Bucanero and Black Warrior teaming with Lizmark Jr. but in the week before the show the partners were switched around to a relevos increíbles match where a Tecnico ("fan favorite") teams up with a "villain" so that Shocker teamed with Lizmark Jr. and Rey Bucanero teamed with Black Warrior. In the end Shocker forced Black Warrior to submit while Lizmark Jr. pinned Rey Bucanero to win the match. Following the match Rey Bucanero and Black Warrior were both shaved bald. The undercard featured a very intense singles match between L.A. Park and Perro Aguayo Jr. that had begun when L.A. Park returned to CMLL some months earlier and involved Aguayo Jr.'s group Los Perros del Mal. Los Perros ended up costing their leader the match as they attacked LA Park during the third and final match, causing a disqualification. The featured four additional matches, all Six-man "Lucha Libre rules" tag team matches with no major storyline build to it.

Production

Background
The Mexican wrestling company Consejo Mundial de Lucha Libre (Spanish for "World Wrestling Council"; CMLL) has held a number of major shows over the years using the moniker Sin Piedad ("No Pity" or "No Mercy"). CMLL has intermittently held a show billed specifically as Sin Piedad since 2000, primarily using the name for their "end of the year" show in December, although once they held a Sin Piedad show in August as well. CMLL has on occasion used a different name for the end-of-year show but Sin Piedad is the most commonly used name. All Sin Piedad shows have been held in Arena México in Mexico City, Mexico which is CMLL's main venue, its "home". Traditionally CMLL holds their major events on Friday Nights, which means the Sin Piedad shows replace their regularly scheduled Super Viernes show. The 2007 Sin Piedad show was the seventh show to use the name.

Storylines
The event featured six professional wrestling matches with different wrestlers involved in pre-existing scripted feuds, plots and storylines. Wrestlers were portrayed as either heels (referred to as rudos in Mexico, those that portray the "bad guys") or faces (técnicos in Mexico, the "good guy" characters) as they followed a series of tension-building events, which culminated in a wrestling match or series of matches.

Results

References

2007 in professional wrestling
CMLL Sin Piedad
December 2007 events in Mexico